Ramón Torrijos y Gómez (1 September 184116 January 1903) was a Spanish ecclesiastic, fourth Bishop of the Roman Catholic Diocese of San Cristóbal de La Laguna and subsequently Bishop of the Roman Catholic Archdiocese of Mérida-Badajoz.

Episcopate 
He was later appointed by Pope Leo XIII as Bishop of the Diocese of Tenerife on 25 November 1887. He took possession of the diocese on 8 December 1888 in the Cathedral of La Laguna. During his pontificate he made the canonical Coronation of the Virgin of Candelaria (patron saint of the Canary Islands), on 13 October 1889, being the fifth Marian image of Spain to be crowned.

He also acquired the Salazar Palace of San Cristóbal de La Laguna as the seat and residence of the bishops of this diocese. In total he ordered 31 diocesan priests. On 10 September 1894 he was transferred to Badajoz, where he died in 1903.

Notes

External links 
 Personal file in Catholic hierarchy.

1841 births
1903 deaths
Roman Catholic bishops of San Cristóbal de La Laguna
Bishops of Badajoz
20th-century Roman Catholic bishops in Spain
19th-century Roman Catholic bishops in Spain